Lynn Verge is a Canadian lawyer and politician from Newfoundland and Labrador. She represented the Corner Brook electoral district of Humber East in the Newfoundland and Labrador House of Assembly from 1979 to 1996. As of 2016, she serves as the executive director of Atwater Library and Computer Centre in Westmount, Quebec.

In 1995, Verge became the first woman to lead a political party in the province when she succeeded Len Simms as leader of the Progressive Conservative Party; she was also the first woman to serve as the Leader of the Official Opposition.

Politics
At the age of 28 she was elected to the House of Assembly in 1979. Following her win Verge was sworn in as Minister of Education in the cabinet of Brian Peckford, becoming one of the first two female cabinet ministers in Newfoundland and Labrador's history. In 1985, Peckford appointed Verge Minister of Justice and Attorney General. She retained the portfolio when Tom Rideout became premier in March 1989 and was also appointed deputy premier. The following month in the 1989 provincial election, the Liberal Party won a majority government, despite the PC Party winning the popular vote. Verge faced off against Liberal leader Clyde Wells in her district of Humber East, and despite him leading his party to victory Wells was defeated by Verge.

Verge sought the leadership of her party in its 1995 leadership race. Her campaign was co-chaired by Kathy Dunderdale, who would later become the province's first female premier. At the convention Verge was elected leader over Loyola Sullivan by a margin of three votes. Her election as leader made Verge the first female leader of a political party in the province. Wells was replaced as Liberal leader and premier by Brian Tobin, a former federal MP and cabinet minister, in 1996. Tobin called a provincial election to be held on February 22, 1996. Tobin was a popular figure in the province and was able to win a large majority government.  The Progressive Conservatives had their worst election in 30 years: they won nine of the 48 seats in the legislature and 39% of the popular vote. Verge was defeated in her own district and subsequently resigned as party leader.

References

External links
 Lynn Verge profile at Memorial University of Newfoundland and Labrador

Living people
Women government ministers of Canada
Canadian women lawyers
Deputy premiers of Newfoundland and Labrador
Education ministers of Newfoundland and Labrador
Female Canadian political party leaders
Lawyers in Newfoundland and Labrador
Leaders of the Progressive Conservative Party of Newfoundland and Labrador
People from Corner Brook
Progressive Conservative Party of Newfoundland and Labrador MHAs
Women MHAs in Newfoundland and Labrador
20th-century Canadian politicians
20th-century Canadian women politicians
Year of birth missing (living people)